
Nand Kishor, Nand Kishore, Nanda Kishore, Nanda Kishor, Nanda Kishore, or Nandikishore may refer to:

People
Nand Kishore Chaudhary (born 1953), Indian social entrepreneur

Arts and entertainment
Nanda Kishore, Indian Kannada film director and screenwriter
Nanda Kishore Bal (1875–1928), Indian poet
Nand Kishore Acharya (born 1945), Indian playwright, poet, and critic

Politics
Nand Kishore (Vikaspuri politician), Member of the Legislative Assembly for Vikaspuri constituency in 2008
Nand Kishore Garg (born 1949), Indian social worker and MLA of Delhi from Trinagar constituency
Nandkishore Jairaj Sharma, Member of the Madhya Pradesh Parliament in 1957
Nand Kishore Yadav (born 1953), Bihar cabinet minister
Nand Kishore Yadav (SP), Uttar Pradesh politician
Nanda Kishor Pun (born 1966), Vice President of Nepal

Sports
Nand Kishore (cricketer, born 1970), Indian cricketer and umpire
Nandikishore Patel (born 1982), Indian-born Ugandan cricketer

Other uses
Nand Kishore Singh Degree College in Uttar Pradesh, India